CHRB may refer to:

California Horse Racing Board, horse racing authority in California, United States
CHRB (AM), a radio station licensed to High River, Alberta, Canada
Corporate Human Rights Benchmark, an index that measures how companies perform according to the United Nations Guiding Principles on Business and Human Rights